Yale Concert is an album by Duke Ellington, recorded at Woolsey Hall, Yale University in New Haven, Connecticut in 1968 and released on the Fantasy label in 1973.

Reception
The AllMusic review by Scott Yanow awarded the album 3 stars and stated "The great Duke Ellington Orchestra was still intact and in its late prime at the time of this performance from 1968. With the death of Billy Strayhorn the year before, Ellington (perhaps sensing his own mortality) accelerated his writing activities, proving that even as he neared 70, he was still at his peak".

Track listing
All compositions by Duke Ellington except as indicated
 "The Little Purple Flower, Parts 1 & 2" - 10:47  
 "Put-tin" (Ellington/Strayhorn) - 3:58  
 "A Chromatic Love Affair" - 3:58  
 "Boola Boola" (Allan M. Hirsh) - 3:18  
 "A Johnny Hodges Medley: Warm Valley/Drag" (Strayhorn) - 7:59  
 "Salome" (Raymond Fol) - 3:28  
 "Swamp Goo" - 4:33  
 "Up Jump" - 3:08  
 "Take the "A" Train" (Strayhorn) - 3:35
Recorded at Woolsey Hall, Yale University in New Haven, Connecticut on January 26, 1968.

Personnel
Duke Ellington – piano
Cat Anderson, Mercer Ellington, Herb Jones, Cootie Williams - trumpet
Lawrence Brown, Buster Cooper - trombone
Chuck Connors - bass trombone
Russell Procope - alto saxophone, clarinet 
Johnny Hodges - alto saxophone
Jimmy Hamilton - clarinet, tenor saxophone
Paul Gonsalves - tenor saxophone
Harry Carney - baritone saxophone
Jeff Castleman - bass
Sam Woodyard - drums

References

1968 live albums
Duke Ellington live albums
Fantasy Records live albums